The 1947 Victorian state election was held in the Australian state of Victoria on Saturday 8 November 1947 to elect 65 members of the state's Legislative Assembly.

Results

Legislative Assembly

|}

See also
Candidates of the 1947 Victorian state election
1946 Victorian Legislative Council election

References

1947 elections in Australia
Elections in Victoria (Australia)
1940s in Victoria (Australia)
November 1947 events in Australia